Hawkins Glacier is a  long glacier in the U.S. state of Alaska. It trends southwest from Mount Bona to its terminus at the Chitina River west of Barnard Glacier, 37 miles (60 km) southeast of McCarthy.

See also
 List of glaciers

References

Glaciers of Alaska
Glaciers of Copper River Census Area, Alaska
Glaciers of Unorganized Borough, Alaska